Mont-Vully is a municipality in the district of See in the canton of Fribourg in Switzerland.  It was formed on 1 January 2016 when the former municipalities of Bas-Vully and Haut-Vully merged.

History
Haut-Vully is first mentioned around 968-85 as Vuisliacense.  In 1453 it was mentioned as Vuilliez.

Bas-Vully is first mentioned in 968 as Williacense.  Until 1831 it was known as vor Commune générale des quatre villages de La Rivière.  The municipality was formerly known by its German name Unterwistenlach; however, that name is no longer used.

Geography

Demographics

Heritage sites of national significance
The House De W. J. Merz, the Gatschet House, the Les Rondas House, the De Steiger House, the d’Erlach-Velga House, the de Wattenwyl House and the oppidum of Mont Vully are listed as Swiss heritage site of national significance.  The entire villages of Môtier and of Praz are part of the Inventory of Swiss Heritage Sites.

World heritage site
It is home to the Môtier I prehistoric pile-dwelling (or stilt house) settlements that are part of the Prehistoric Pile dwellings around the Alps UNESCO World Heritage Site.

The Môtier I site has been only lightly studied. It appears to be the site of a Neolithic settlement, based on the discovery of stone axes, but has not been more exactly dated. The site was discovered in 1860 by Colonel Schwab and may have contained decaying wooden piles during the 19th century. The entire site is currently located on dry land and is covered by earth.

Transportation
The municipality has a railway station, on the Fribourg–Ins line.

References

External links

 Official website 
 
 
 
 
 
 
 

Municipalities of the canton of Fribourg
Cultural property of national significance in the canton of Fribourg
Populated places established in 2016